Turner Ashby High School is located in Bridgewater, Virginia in the Rockingham County Public School district.

History
When Turner Ashby High School opened in the fall of 1956, it became the third consolidated high school in Rockingham County. Schools consolidated were Bridgewater, Dayton, and Mt. Clinton. The original Turner Ashby building was located on a twenty-acre plot on the north side of Dayton, and now serves grades six through eight as Wilbur S. Pence Middle School.

The name Turner Ashby High School was selected by the Rockingham County School Board because of the school’s location in the Ashby District of the county. The Ashby District was named for Confederate General Turner Ashby, a native of Fauquier County, who served as cavalry commander for Stonewall Jackson for the first year of the American Civil War. Ashby was killed in battle near Harrisonburg just prior to Jackson's victories at Cross Keys and Port Republic and the culmination of the 1862 Valley Campaign.

The original building was designed and constructed for grades eight through twelve. The approximate cost of the school was $1,000,000.00. Classroom additions were added in 1960 and 1962. Mobile units were added for classroom use in 1973, 1975, and 1980. Also, beginning in 1966, the eighth grade was moved to the John Wayland Intermediate School, now John Wayland Elementary School.

Turner Ashby High School moved into its new and present facility on Route 42 north of Bridgewater in the fall of 1989. The new facility, including site development, furnishings, building, etc. was built for approximately $15,300,000.00.

This modern facility has more cafeteria, music, athletic, storage, and classroom areas designed to serve up to 1200 students. Three mobile units were added for classroom use in 1998, and five more were added in 2000.

During the 2001-2002 school year and the following summer, a new wing was added to the 1989 building. This addition added 20+ new classrooms including 4 new science rooms and another general purpose computer lab. Along with the addition of the new wing, the library was expanded and a girls’ team room was added.

Principals
F. N. Postlethwait - 1956-1961
W. Carl Yowell - 1961-1964
E. Cameron Miller - 1964-1969
Samuel Ritchie - 1969-1992
Michael Loso - 1992-1997
Delmer Botkin - 1997-2005
Steven Walk - 2005–2015
Phil Judd - 2015–2022
Chris Noll - 2022-present

Competitive titles

Sports titles
 1968 State II Boys’ Track & Field
 1968 State II Boys' Basketball
 1971 State AA Baseball
 1974 State AA Baseball
 1975 State AA Baseball
 1985 State AA Girls' Volleyball
 1998 State AA Girls' Basketball
 1999 State AA Girls' Basketball
 2000 State AA Cheerleading
 2002 State AA Baseball
 2004 State AA Softball
 2005 State AA Division III Football
 2006 State AA Baseball
 2007 State AA Baseball
 2015 State AA Girls' Basketball
 2017 State 3A Baseball

Marching band titles
 2004 Class A James Madison University Parade of Champions
 2007 Class A James Madison University Parade of Champions
 2017 Class A James Madison University Parade of Champions

Drama titles
 2017 1st Place Technical Olympics at Virginia Theatre Association Conference
 2016 1st Place VHSL 3A State Championship One Act Play "Peter/Wendy"
 2016 3A State Outstanding Performance Award for Gino Stickley and Blaire Sharman
 2016 All Star Cast Award for Gino Stickley One Act Play "Peter/Wendy" at Virginia Theatre Association Conference
 2016 Distinguishable Technical Merit Award One Act Play "Peter/Wendy" at Virginia Theatre Association Conference
 2016 Honorable Mention One Act Play "Peter/Wendy" at Virginia Theatre Association Conference
 2016 3A West Regional Outstanding Performance Award for Gino Stickley
 2016 1st Place 3A West Regional Competition One Act Play "Peter/Wendy"
 2016 Conference 29 Outstanding Performance Award for Gino Stickley, Blaire Sharman, and Brad Ridder
 2016 1st Place Conference 29 Competition One Act Play "Peter/Wendy"
 2015 Conference 29 Outstanding Performance Award for Blaire Sharman, Gino Stickley, and Wyatt Coggins
 2015 2nd Place Conference 29 Competition One Act Play "The Great Choice"
 2012 competed at Southeastern Theatre Conference (representing the state of Virginia) "Anatomy of Gray" All Superior Ratings
 2011 1st Place VHSL State Championship "Anatomy of Gray"
 State All Star Cast Awards: Megan Clinedinst and Andrew Raines
 2011 1st Place Southern Valley Regional Competition One Act Play "Anatomy of Gray"
 2011 1st Place Massanutten District Competition One Act Play "Anatomy of Gray"
 2011 1st Place Virginia Theatre Association Conference One Act Competition "Anatomy of Gray"
 2011 1st Place State Competition One Act Play
 2010 4th Place State Competition One Act Play
 2010 1st Place Massanutten Regional Competition One Act Play
 2010 2nd Place Massanutten District Competition One Act Play
 2010 Superior Rating at Virginia Theatre Association Conference One Act Competition
 2009 4th Place State Competition One Act Play
 2009 1st Place Massanutten Regional Competition One Act Play
 2009 1st Place Massanutten District Competition One Act Play
 2009 Superior Rating at Virginia Theatre Association Conference One Act Competition "Alice in Wonderland"
 2009 All Star Cast Award for Colin McLaughlin at Virginia Theatre Association Conference
 2009 All Star Cast Award for Lindsey Fitzgerald at Virginia Theatre Association Conference
 2010 1st Place Massanutten Regional Competition One Act Play "The King Stag"
 2010 2nd Place Massanutten District Competition One Act Play "The King Stag"
 2010 Superior Rating at Virginia Theatre Association Conference One Act Competition "The King Stag"
 2002 1st place VHSL one act competition "Picnic on the Battlefield" directed by Michelle Canada
 2002 VHSL district competition outstanding Performance by an Actor Douglas "Alan" Diehl
 2002 1st place forensic duo interp Patrick Tucker and Douglas Diehl
 2002 VTA All Star Cast Douglas Diehl, Patrick Tucker
 2000 VHSL 1st place "Echos in the Hallway" written and directed by Joseph Hiney

Student organizations 
Art
Association for Computing Machinery
Creative Writing
Effective School-wide Discipline / Student Connections
Distributive Education Clubs of America
Diversity
Drama
Family, Career and Community Leaders of America
Forensics
French
Future Business Leaders of America
Future Educators Association
Future Farmers of America
NAC
National Honors Society
Pre-Medical
Ruri-Teen
Technology Student Association
Tri-M / Musical Heritage Society
Science
SkillsUSA
Spanish
Sports Medicine
STARS
Student Council Association
Yearbook
Youth and Government

Notable alumni

 Alan Knicely (Class of 1973) - former MLB player (Houston Astros, Cincinnati Reds, Philadelphia Phillies, St. Louis Cardinals)
 Brian Bocock (Class of 2003) - former Major League Baseball player for the San Francisco Giants, and minor league affiliates for the Philadelphia Phillies, Pittsburgh Pirates, Toronto Blue Jays, and Kansas City Royals

References

External links
 Turner Ashby High School

Public high schools in Virginia
Schools in Rockingham County, Virginia
Educational institutions established in 1956
1956 establishments in Virginia